Berezhki is a rural locality (a village) in Filippovskoye Rural Settlement, Kirzhachsky District, Vladimir Oblast, Russia. The population was 9 as of 2010. There are 37 streets.

Geography 
Berezhki is located on the Sherna River, 16 km west of Kirzhach (the district's administrative centre) by road. Sergiyevka is the nearest rural locality.

References 

Rural localities in Kirzhachsky District